S9 is a line on the Berlin S-Bahn. It operates from Flughafen BER-Terminals 1/2 to Spandau through Berlin Hauptbahnhof (Berlin Central Station) over:
a very short section of the Outer ring, opened in 1951 and electrified in 1983, 
a short section of the former Outer freight ring opened in the early 1940s and electrified in 1983,
the Görlitz line, opened in 1866 and electrified in 1929, 
the Ring line, completed in 1877 and electrified in 1926 and, via a connecting curve,
the Berlin–Wrocław railway, which at Berlin Ostbahnhof becomes
the Berlin Stadtbahn to Charlottenburg,
the Spandau Suburban Line.

References

Berlin S-Bahn lines